Aiboa is a station on line 1 of the Bilbao metro. It is located in the neighborhood of Aiboa, in the municipality of Getxo. The station opened on 11 November 1995.

Station layout 
It is an at-grade, open-air station with one island platform.

Access 

   19 Txakursolo St.
   17 Txakursolo St.
   Station's interior

Services 
The station is served by line 1 from Etxebarri to Plentzia.

References

External links
 

Line 1 (Bilbao metro) stations
Railway stations in Spain opened in 1995
1995 establishments in the Basque Country (autonomous community)
Getxo